Yuttapong Boonamporn is a Thai footballer. He won the Thai Premier League title in 2008 with Provincial Electricity Authority.

He played for the Thai national team at the 1998 Asian Games.

Honours
 Thailand Premier League 1998 -Sinthana FC
 Thailand Premier League 2008 -PEA FC

References

Living people
Yuttapong Boonamporn
1976 births
Yuttapong Boonamporn
Association football midfielders
Yuttapong Boonamporn
Yuttapong Boonamporn
Yuttapong Boonamporn
Yuttapong Boonamporn
Footballers at the 1998 Asian Games
Yuttapong Boonamporn
Yuttapong Boonamporn